Triplemanía V-B was the second part of the fifth Triplemanía professional wrestling show promoted by AAA. 1997 was fourth year to feature the "Triplemanía Series" of shows with two, referred to as V-A and V-B, where this was the second and final of the series. The show took place on June 15, 1997 in Naulcalpan, Mexico. The main event featured an eight-man "Atómicos" tag-team match between the teams of Perro Aguayo, Octagón, Cibernético and El Canek and Jake Roberts, Gorgeous George III, El Cobarde Jr. and Fuerza Guerrera.

Production

Background
In early 1992 Antonio Peña was working as a booker and storyline writer for Consejo Mundial de Lucha Libre (CMLL), Mexico's largest and the world's oldest wrestling promotion, and was frustrated by CMLL's very conservative approach to lucha libre. He joined forced with a number of younger, very talented wrestlers who felt like CMLL was not giving them the recognition they deserved and decided to split from CMLL to create Asistencia Asesoría y Administración, later known simply as "AAA"  or Triple A. After making a deal with the Televisa television network AAA held their first show in April 1992. The following year Peña and AAA held their first Triplemanía event, building it into an annual event that would become AAA's Super Bowl event, similar to the WWE's WrestleMania being the biggest show of the year. The 1997 Triplemanía was the fifth year in a row AAA held a Triplemanía show and the twelfth overall show under the Triplemanía banner.

Storylines
The Triplemanía V-B show featured eight professional wrestling matches with different wrestlers involved in pre-existing scripted feuds, plots and storylines. Wrestlers were portrayed as either heels (referred to as rudos in Mexico, those that portray the "bad guys") or faces (técnicos in Mexico, the "good guy" characters) as they followed a series of tension-building events, which culminated in a wrestling match or series of matches.

Results

References

External links
Triplemanía V at LuchaLibreAAA.com

1997 in professional wrestling
Triplemanía
June 1997 events in Mexico